Southern Harmony is a minimalist composition by William Duckworth written in 1980 and 1981. It is scored for unaccompanied mixed chorus, and is an original work created through adaptation of shape-note songs from the 1854 compilation Southern Harmony and Musical Companion (first published 1835).  Southern Harmony is divided into four books (or sections) that were premiered over the span of a decade. The complete work was premiered in February 1992 at Merkin Concert Hall in New York by the Gregg Smith Singers.

Movements
The individual movements of Southern Harmony are:

Book One
 Consolation
 Wondrous Love
 Hebrew Children
 Solemn Thought
 Rock of Ages

Book Two

Book Three

Book Four

References

 Monroe Street Music 
 Southern Harmony compact disk 
 Silverman, Adam. "Stylistic Combination and Methodical Construction in William Duckworth's Southern Harmony". Contemporary Music Review Volume 20, Number 4, 2001, pp. 45–59 (15). 

Minimalistic compositions
1981 compositions
Choral compositions
Compositions by William Duckworth